is the second and final studio album by Animetal Lady (Animetal with Mie of Pink Lady as the vocalist). Released through Cutting Edge Records on April 10, 2002, the album consists of a non-stop marathon of metal covers of shōjo anime theme songs, children's anime theme songs, and other anime theme songs sung by women. It features a guest appearance by former Megadeth guitarist Marty Friedman. At 30 minutes long, Animetal Lady Marathon II is the shortest studio album in Animetal's discography.

Track listing
All tracks are arranged by Animetal Lady except track 23 by Kohichi Seiyama.

Personnel
 - lead vocals
 - guitar
Masaki - bass

with

Katsuji - drums
 - keyboards (1, 3, 5, 7, 10, 13, 20, 22-23)
Marty Friedman - lead guitar (17)

Footnotes

References

External links

2002 albums
Animetal albums
Japanese-language albums
Covers albums
Avex Group albums